Anthony Horace Gioia (born November 10, 1942) is an American businessman and statesman, who served as the 14th United States Ambassador to Malta from 2001 to 2004. A member of the Republican Party, Gioia previously served as the president of the Gioia Macaroni Company and as Chairman of the National Pasta Association.

Notes

External links
"Anthony H. Gioia" on U.S. Department of State website.
107th Congress (2001-2002): PN456 — Anthony Horace Gioia — Department of State

1941 births
Living people
Ambassadors of the United States to Malta
American people of Italian descent
Pasta industry
Businesspeople from Buffalo, New York
University at Buffalo alumni
Marshall School of Business alumni
New York (state) Republicans